Alpay is a masculine Turkish given name, and a surname. It derives from "alp". In Turkish, "alp" means "stouthearted", "brave", "chivalrous", "daredevil", "valorous", and/or "gallant".

Notable persons with that name include:

People with the given name
Alpay (singer), Turkish singer
Alpay Özalan (born 1973), Turkish footballer
 Alpay Şalt, Turkish musician, member of the band Yüksek Sadakat

People with the surname 
David Alpay (born 1980), Canadian actor

Turkish masculine given names
Turkish-language surnames